"U.S. Male" is a song by Jerry Reed, and appears on his 1967, debut album, The Unbelievable Guitar and Voice of Jerry Reed.

Elvis Presley recording
A year after Jerry Reed's recording, "U.S. Male" was covered by Elvis Presley.  It reached number 28 on the U.S. Billboard Hot 100 during the spring of 1968. The song was recorded in January 1968 and followed the kind of country-influenced rock and roll sound Presley had already recorded in September 1967 with songs like "Big Boss Man" and "Guitar Man". Presley recorded these three songs accompanied by Reed on lead guitar. It paved the way for Presley's famous '68 Comeback Special, filmed in June 1968 and broadcast on NBC on December 3, 1968.

Accolades
Dave Marsh included the song in his collection, The Heart of Rock & Soul: The 1001 Greatest Singles Ever Made as song #655.

References

Elvis Presley songs
Songs written by Jerry Reed
1968 singles
1968 songs